Remy & Boo is a Canadian animated children's television series created by Matthew Fernandes that premiered on Universal Kids on May 1, 2020. It centers on an adventurous 6-year-old girl and her best friend, a big and squishy pink robot. The series was produced by Industrial Brothers in association with Boat Rocker Studios.

After 26 episodes (52 half-hour segments), the series concluded on October 10, 2020.

Premise
The series follows Remy, an adventurous 6-year-old girl with a unique best friend named Boo, who is a big, squishy, pink robot. Fueled by Remy's indomitable spirit and Boo's can-do attitude, their days in Dolphin Bay are filled with new adventures both big and small powered by two incredible imaginations. Through heartwarming, humorous and inventive storytelling, the characters discover their place in the world and learn that there is no greater power than the power of friendship.

Characters

Main 
 Remy (voiced by Ava Ro) is a little girl who is able to play ukulele.
 Boo (voiced by Rob Tinkler) is Remy's robot pet and companion who resembles a quadruped creature. His abilities include flying by conjuring balloons from his back, shooting light-based confetti, or extending a robot arm with a certain tool to fix things. To recharge, Boo needs to either be in his charging pod, go into sleep mode, or in small doses receive hugs called "snuzzles" from Remy. Despite mostly mumbling, Boo is able to speak a few words.

Supporting 
 Nikhil (voiced by Chris D'Silva) is Remy's human friend.
 Mia (voiced by Madison Abbott) is Remy's other human friend.
 Remy's Mom (voiced by Katie Griffin) is a marine biologist. 
 Remy's Dad (voiced by Jonathan Tan) is a diner operator and runs a diner called Shrimpy's.
 Skipper Jack (voiced by Brad Adamson) is a fisherman.
 Poppy (voiced by Derek McGrath) is Remy's maternal grandfather and Boo's creator who lives in the lighthouse. As a boy, Poppy created a wind-up toy which would be the basis for Boo's design.
 Mr. Periwinkle (voiced by John Cleland) is Remy and Boo's snooty neighbor who lives on their opposite side of the street.
 Skylar (voiced by Gabby Clarke) is Remy's cousin who used to have the same interests as Remy but has adapted into the goth subculture when her old friend Ava left Dolphin Bay.
 EB (voiced by Bryn McAuley) is Remy's friend who works at the milkshake stand. She has pink hair.

Pets 
 Beans is Remy's pet tabby cat.
 Cutesu is Mia's high-tech toy dog that almost has a mind of its own. He almost only barks, but at times says his catchphrase "I love you!"
 Peaches is Mr. Periwinkle's pet poodle with no definite gender.

Episodes

Production 
The show was announced in 2017, alongside Norman Picklestripes, Powerbirds, The Big Fun Crafty Show, and 3 other shows.

Notes

References

External links
 
 Remy & Boo at Universal Kids

2020 Canadian television series debuts
2020 Canadian television series endings
2020s Canadian animated television series
2020s Canadian children's television series
2020s Canadian science fiction television series
Animated television series about children
Animated television series about robots
Canadian children's animated adventure television series
Canadian children's animated science fiction television series
Canadian computer-animated television series
Canadian preschool education television series
Animated preschool education television series
2020s preschool education television series
English-language television shows
Universal Kids original programming
Television series by Boat Rocker Media